Karuppannan Jaishankar is the founding Principal Director & Professor of Criminology and Crime Sciences at the International Institute of Crime & Security Sciences (IICSS) (A Not-for-Profit Academic Institution and Independent Policy Think Tank) Bengaluru, Karnataka, India. He is the founding Father of Cyber Criminology, an academic sub-discipline of Criminology.

Career and education 
Jaishankar was earlier the Professor and Head of the Department of Criminology at the Raksha Shakti University (now Rashtriya Raksha University) Gandhinagar, Gujarat, India. Prior to that, he was a Senior Assistant Professor at the Department of Criminology and Criminal Justice, Manonmaniam Sundaranar University, Tirunelveli, Tamil Nadu, India.

He was a Commonwealth Academic Fellow during 2009–2010 at the Centre for Criminal Justice Studies, School of Law, University of Leeds.

He is the Founder and President of the South Asian Society of Criminology and Victimology (SASCV) (founded 2009) which works "to develop Criminology and Victimology in the South Asian region" and has organized five international conferences of SASCV as the General Chair (Bangalore 2023, Ahmedabad, 2020, Goa, 2016, Kanyakumari, 2013, and Jaipur, 2011).

He is the Founder and Executive Director of the Centre for Cyber Victim Counselling (CCVC) (founded 2009) which works with the motto to prevent cyber victimization and protect cyber victims.

He is the proponent of the "Space Transition Theory", which holds that people behave differently online than they do in real life.

He earned a Ph.D. in Criminology, an M.A. in Criminology, a PG Diploma in Geographic Information Systems Management from the University of Madras, Chennai, Tamil Nadu, India and B.Sc. in Biochemistry from the PSG College of Arts and Science, Bharathiar University, Coimbatore, Tamil Nadu, India.

Publications

Awards and honors 

He is ranked 16th among the Top 25 Influential Criminologists in the World during 2010-2020.

He is a United Nations Expert on matters related to Victims of Terrorism (2019).

He is appointed by the British Society of Criminology (BSC) as an International Ambassador (2015).

Jaishankar is the First Winner of the National Academy of Sciences, India (NASI) - SCOPUS Young Scientist Award in the category "Social sciences" (2012).

References 

Living people
Criminology educators
Academic journal editors
Scholars from Gujarat
University of Madras alumni
Academics of the University of Leeds
Indian social sciences writers
21st-century Indian educators
Year of birth missing (living people)